Varfolomeyevka may refer to:
Varfolomeyevka (village), Primorsky Krai, a village (selo) in Primorsky Krai, Russia
Varfolomeyevka (air base), a Cold War air base close to Varfolomeyevka, Primorsky Krai
Varfolomeyevka (railway station), Primorsky Krai, a railway station incorporated as an inhabited locality in Primorsky Krai, Russia
Varfolomeyevka, Saratov Oblast, a village (selo) in Saratov Oblast, Russia

References